Hirosue (written: 広末 or 廣末) is a Japanese surname. Notable people with the surname include:

, Japanese footballer
, Japanese actress and singer

See also
Hirose

Japanese-language surnames